Philip George Hoene (born March 15, 1949) is an American former professional ice hockey player who played for the Los Angeles Kings in the National Hockey League.

Career 
Hoene played high school hockey under Coach Del Genereau at Duluth Cathedral High School from 1963 to 1967. The team won the Catholic High School State Tournament all four years. In 1967, he scored a hat trick in 37 seconds in a game against Duluth East High School, a major rival at the time.
Hoene went on to play for the University of Minnesota Duluth in the WCHA from 1967 to 1971, after which he entered the professional ranks with the Los Angeles Kings.

Career statistics

External links

1949 births
Living people
American men's ice hockey centers
Ice hockey people from Duluth, Minnesota
Fort Worth Texans players
Los Angeles Kings players
Springfield Kings players
Minnesota Duluth Bulldogs men's ice hockey players
Undrafted National Hockey League players